Esperies is a former municipality on the island of Corfu, Ionian Islands, Greece. Since the 2019 local government reform it is part of the municipality North Corfu, of which it is a municipal unit. It is located in the northwest corner of the island of Corfu. The seat of the municipality was the town of Velonades (pop. 392). Its largest towns are Karousades (pop. 991), Avliotes (830), Peroulades (673), and Velonades.

Subdivisions
The municipal unit Esperies is subdivided into the following communities (constituent villages in brackets):
Agioi Douloi
Agrafoi (Agrafoi, Agia Paraskevi)
Antipernoi
Avliotes (Avliotes, Agia Pelagia, Agios Stefanos Avliotes, Garnades, Kouknikades, Staousa)
Kavallouri
Karousades (Karousades, Agios Ioannis, Astrakeri, Roda)
Magoulades (Magoulades, Arillas, Gousades, Poulimates, Tsoukalio)
Peroulades (Peroulades, Mega Ydri)
Sidari
Valaneio
Velonades (Velonades, Kounavades, Livadi, Psathylas)

Population

External links
Esperies on GTP Travel Pages

References

Populated places in Corfu (regional unit)